Where Fear and Weapons Meet was a hardcore punk band from South Florida. The group's first EP appeared in 1998; they followed it with a full-length in 1999, both on Revelation Records, and won nationwide exposure. They then released a split with Comin' Correct before returning with another full-length, Unstoppable, on Triple Crown Records. Their final release was Control, in 2003.

In June 2012, it was announced that the band will reunite the following October at the Bringin' It Back For The Kids Fest 2 in Pompano Beach, Florida.

Discography
 Where Fear and Weapons Meet EP (Revelation Records, 1998)
 The Weapon (Revelation Records, 1999)
 Split (Temperance Records, 2000)
 Unstoppable (Triple Crown Records, 2001)
 Control (Eulogy Recordings, 2003)

References

External links
 Where Fear and Weapons Meet on Eulogy Records
 Where Fear and Weapons Meet on Revelation Records

Musical groups from Fort Lauderdale, Florida
American hardcore punk groups
Musical groups established in 1998
Musical groups disestablished in 2004
Musical groups reestablished in 2012
Triple Crown Records artists
1998 establishments in Florida
Eulogy Recordings artists
Revelation Records artists